Blanca Luz Purificación Dalila Soto Plata (born 14 September 1951) is a Mexican politician from the Institutional Revolutionary Party. In 2012 she served as Deputy of the LXI Legislature of the Mexican Congress representing Hidalgo.

References

1951 births
Living people
Politicians from Hidalgo (state)
Women members of the Chamber of Deputies (Mexico)
Institutional Revolutionary Party politicians
21st-century Mexican politicians
21st-century Mexican women politicians
Deputies of the LXI Legislature of Mexico
Members of the Chamber of Deputies (Mexico) for Hidalgo (state)